Cnissostages is a genus of moths in the family Arrhenophanidae.

Species
 Cnissostages oleagina Zeller, 1863
 Cnissostages mastictor Bradley, 1951
 Cnissostages osae Davis, 2003

External links
Family Arrhenophanidae

Arrhenophanidae